This is a list of photojournalists.

List of photojournalists by country

Australia
United States
Canada

Others

 Arko Datta (1969)
 Mayank Austen Soofi 
 Danish Siddiqui (1983 – 2021)
 Walter Bosshard (photojournalist) (1892 – 1975)
 William Klein (photographer) (1928-)
 Eddie Adams (1933–2004)
 Lynsey Addario (1973–)
 Timothy Allen (1971–)
 Ali Hassan al-Jaber (1955–2011)
 Stephen Alvarez (1965–)
 Mohamed Amin (1943–1996)
 Pablo Bartholomew (1955–)
 Gary Mark Smith (1956–)
 Felice Beato (1825–1903)
 Fatemeh Behboudi (1985–)
 Joshua Benoliel (1873–1932)
 Daniel Berehulak (1975–)
 Marcus Bleasdale (1968–)
 Margaret Bourke-White (1904–1971)
 Jane Bown (1925–2014)
 Mathew Brady (1823–1896)
 Esther Bubley (1921–1998)
 Dan Budnik (1933–2020)
 Romano Cagnoni (1935–2018)
 Robert Capa (1913–1954)
 Gilles Caron (1939–1970)
 Marion Carpenter (1920–2002)
 Kevin Carter (1960–1994)
 Henri Cartier-Bresson (1908–2004)
 Dickey Chapelle (1919–1965)
 Don Hogan Charles (1938–2017)
 Filip Claus (1957–)
 Martha Cooper (1943–)
 Joseph Costa (1904–1988)
 Manoocher Deghati (1954–)
 Françoise Demulder (1947–2008)
 Yan Dobronosov
 Lucas Dolega (1978–2011)
 Sergio Dorantes (1946–)
 David Douglas Duncan (1916–2018)
 Thomas Dworzak (1972–)
 Clifton C. Edom (1907–1991)
 Jacob Elbaz (1945–)
 Dan Eldon (1970–1993)
 Walker Evans (1903–1975)
 Timothy Fadek (1969–)
 Najlah Feanny (1961–)
 Roger Fenton (1819–1869)
 Jim Fenwick (1934–2021)
 Jockel Finck (1962–2006)
 Rowe Findley (1925–2003)
 Kevin Frayer (1973–)
 Shiho Fukada (1953–)
 Cédric Gerbehaye (1977–)
 Jan Grarup (1968–)
 Lauren Greenfield (1966–)
 Annie Griffiths (1953–)
 Ken Griffiths (1945–2014)
 Lu Guang (1961–)
 Carol Guzy (1956–)
 Anton Hammerl (1969–2011)
 Tim Hetherington (1970–2011)
 Stuart Heydinger (1927–2019)
 Chris Hondros (1970–2011)
 Bunyo Ishikawa (1938–)
 Ferzat Jarban (?–2011)
 Chris Johns (1951–)
 Ed Kashi (1957–)
 André Kertész (1894–1985)
 Russell Klika (1960–)
 Gary Knight (1964–)
 Shisei Kuwabara (1936–)
 Vincent Laforet (1975–)
 Camille Lepage (1988–2014)
 Catherine Leroy (1944–2006)
 Alex Levac (1944–)
 Rick Loomis (1969–)
 Stefan Lorant (1901–1997)
 Danny Lyon (1942–)
 Greg Marinovich (1962–)
 Spider Martin (1939–2003)
 Enrico Martino (1960–)
 Don McCullin (1935–)
 Steve McCurry (1950–)
 Joseph McKeown (1925–2007)
 Susan Meiselas (1948–)
 Hansel Mieth (1909–1998)
 Lee Miller (1907–1977)
 Zoriah Miller (1976–)
 Ozier Muhammad (1950–)
 James Nachtwey (1948–)
 Kenji Nagai (1957–2007)
 Antonio Olmos (1963–)
 Ken Oosterbroek (1962–1994)
 Burhan Ozbilici
 Tim Page (1944–2022)
 Gordon Parks (1912–2006)
 Martin Parr (1952–)
 Lucian Perkins (1953–)
 Tom Stoddart (1953 – 17 November 2021)
 Conrad Poirier (1912–1968)
 Fabio Polenghi (1962–2010)
 Dith Pran (1942–2008)
 Altaf Qadri (1976–)
 Gérard Rancinan (1953–)
 Ryan Spencer Reed (1979–)
 Fredrik Renander (1980–)
 Dezső Révai (1903–1996)
 Reza (1952–)
 Eugene Richards (1944–)
 Robert Riger (1924–1995)
 Manuel Rivera-Ortiz (1968–)
 James Robertson (1813–1888)
 Grace Robertson (1930–2021)
 Ruth Robertson (1905–1998)
 Arthur Rothstein (1915–1985)
 David Rubinger (1924–2017)
 Didier Ruef (1961–)
 Sumy Sadurni (1989–2022)
 Sebastião Salgado (1944–)
 Erich Salomon (1886–1944)
 Luis Carlos Santiago (1989–2010)
 Mike Schennum
 Lawrence Schiller (1936–)
 Ignác Šechtl (1840–1911)
 Josef Jindřich Šechtl (1877–1954)
 Ragnar Th. Sigurdsson (1958–)
 João Silva (1966–)
 W. Eugene Smith (1918–1978)
 Sally Soames (1937–2019)
 Pete Souza (1954–)
 Chris Steele-Perkins (1947–)
 Lisl Steiner (1927–)
 Dana Stone (1939–1970)
 Gerda Taro (1910–1937)
 Sebastiano Tomada (1986–)
 Stanley Tretick (1921–1999)
 David C. Turnley (1955–)
 Peter Turnley (1955–)
 Julia Tutwiler (1841–1916)
 Nick Ut (1951–)
 Franck Vogel (1977–)
 Homai Vyarawalla (1913–2012)
 Jeff Widener (1956–)
 Kamran Yusuf (Kamran Yousuf) (1994–)
 Hocine Zaourar (1952–)
 Rija Randrianasolo (1973–)
 Isadora Romero

See also
 List of photographers
 List of street photographers
 List of photographs considered the most important

References

External links
 Library of Congress List of Women Photojournalists

 
Photojournalists
Photojournalists